Ricky Ricotta's Mighty Robot is a series of children's graphic novels written by Dav Pilkey (best known for his Captain Underpants books) and first seven books illustrated by Martin Ontiveros and all nine books, including two long-awaited sequels, illustrated by Dan Santat. In each book, Ricky Ricotta, a mouse, with the help of his mighty robot, saves the world from an evil villain. Also, the books each have an alien creature from a different planet in order from closest-to-sun to farthest-from-sun including Earth, as the villain of the first book is from Earth. The reader could see the villains being jailed in each series and later notice the familiar villains from previous books.

Publication history
The first three books were initially published as Ricky Ricotta's Giant Robot. Dav Pilkey stopped using Giant in 2002 after many young fans pointed out that the Robot is not a giant. Many young readers suggested the adjective "Mighty" instead, so after careful consideration, Pilkey changed the title of all the books.

Dan Santat replaced Martin Ontiveros as the illustrator in 2014 and had the first seven books re-drawn by Santat plus illustrated the remaining two books that were not published with Ontiveros as the illustrator. Books 1 through 5 with Santat's illustrations were released in 2014, books 6 and 7 were released in 2015, and the new books 8 and 9 were released in 2016. This happened in 2012 when a Ricky Ricotta fan in Canada begged Pilkey for more Ricky Ricotta books. Shortly after that, his editor and the publisher decided to not only create more Ricky Ricotta books but also to re-illustrate the previous books modernly in colors plus add never-before-seen mini-comics. Pilkey's editor asked who he wanted for re-illustrations, and he chose Dan Santat as the only illustrator in mind. And fortunately for Pilkey, Santat agreed to re-illustrate all seven books, plus illustrate two new remaining, unpublished Ricky Ricotta's Mighty Robot adventures.

Graphic Novels

Ricky Ricotta's Mighty Robot

Ricky Ricotta's Mighty Robot (2000) is by Dav Pilkey and illustrated by Martin Ontiveros (2000 version) and Dan Santat (2014 version), the first in the series. The book was initially called Ricky Ricotta's Giant Robot. However, it was changed because he is only about 12 times taller than a mouse, and therefore, that does not make him very tall.

Ricky Ricotta is a lonely mouse who lives in Squeakyville. He always wishes he had a close companion to keep him company. Once Ricky starts school, he gets bullied because of his small size. He was full of sadness because the bullies picked on him. Ricky wishes that something big would happen. In a secret cave on the mountain top, the crazed rat scientist, Dr. Stinky McNasty, creates a giant robot to destroy Earth. When the robot refuses to do so, Dr. McNasty zaps the robot as punishment. Luckily, though, Ricky happens to be watching at the time. He kicks a ball at the deranged doctor, and the ray gun is smashed, forcing McNasty to retreat. When the robot sees what Ricky has done, Ricky befriends the robot. Ricky shows his parents, teachers, and schoolmates how helpful the robot can be, but since the robot can't fit in the house, Ricky resorts to stashing him in the garage.

Meanwhile, Dr. McNasty is plotting revenge. He brings a potion of hatred and feeds it to the classroom lizard. The lizard becomes Dr. McNasty's new, more obedient servant and starts attacking. After Ricky's robot pal bests the lizard in battle, the lizard returns to normal. Enraged at what has just happened, Dr. McNasty decides to destroy the robot himself. He pulls out a rocket launcher, but Ricky jumps at him just as he pulls the trigger. The rocket ends up landing on Dr. McNasty's secret cave, destroying it. Dr. McNasty grows angry when it is a bad day for him. Together, Ricky and his robot imprison the scientist. During the cookout, Ricky talks to his parents about the adventures. He, therefore, hopes his Mighty Robot will be by his side when he says the line, That's what friends are for.

Ricky Ricotta's Mighty Robot vs. the Mutant Mosquitoes from Mercury

Ricky Ricotta's Mighty Robot vs. the Mutant Mosquitoes from Mercury (2000) is by Dav Pilkey and illustrated by Martin Ontiveros (2000 version) and Dan Santat (2014 version), the second in the series.

The story opens with a demonstration of how Ricky's robot helps him out. Ricky looks through the robot's telescopic eye, sees Mercury, and thinks it's cool. But Mr. Mosquito doesn't feel the same since he lives on Mercury. He hates the scorching days and the freezing nights, so he tries to find a place with more favorable conditions. He decides on Earth and creates "Mutant Mosquitoes," which he uses to take the world over. Meanwhile, Ricky spots the Mutant Mosquitoes, and he asks his teacher if he can go, but he is refused because he has to finish his math test first. Thanks to Ricky's Robot, he solves the final problems in an instant.

The Mighty Robot defeats the mosquitoes with a spray, sending them back to Mercury. Angry, Mr. Mosquito drags Ricky into his ship, turning his ship into a Robotic Mecha-Mosquito, which battles Ricky's robot. However, Ricky's Robot refuses to fight back because it is worried Ricky will get harmed if it does. Ricky distracts the mosquito by requesting to use the restroom and climbing out the window. With Ricky now out of danger, the robot battles the Mecha-Mosquito and defeats the menace. Mr. Mosquito laments having a bad day and is thrown in the clink afterward. In the end, they go home with milk and grilled cheese. Ricky, therefore, hopes his robot will be by his side.

Ricky Ricotta's Mighty Robot vs. the Voodoo/Video Vultures from Venus

Ricky Ricotta's Mighty Robot vs. the Voodoo Vultures from Venus (2001) is by Dav Pilkey and illustrated by Martin Ontiveros (2001 version) and Dan Santat (2014 version), the third in the series. The title was later updated, renaming the Voodoo Vultures to "Video Vultures," likely because the Vultures don't use voodoo in the book.

The story starts when Ricky Ricotta and his Mighty Robot are late for supper because they were in the capital of Hawaii, collecting seashells. Ricky's mom says that he has been late for supper all week and tells Ricky and his Mighty Robot that they cannot watch TV until the both of them learn the value of responsibility. Since the Mighty Robot is unfamiliar with responsibility, Ricky explains that it means doing the right things at the right time. Of course, while the duo is good at the right things, they have trouble with doing them at the right time. Ricky and his robot sleep under the stars while every other mouse in Squeakyville watches TV.

Meanwhile, on Venus, the Voodoo/Video Vultures are frustrated with the unbearably hot atmosphere of their planet, which reduces their food into a melted mess. Hoping to eat better food, they fire a transmission beam to all of the TVs in Squeakyville. All TVs broadcast a signal that hypnotizes all the mice watching TV. Ricky and his Mighty Robot realize the following day that the mice are hypnotized and have been ordered to bring food to the army of Voodoo/Video Vultures. Ricky comes up with a plan to stuff chocolate chip cookies with hot chili peppers. Ricky then pretends to be hypnotized and takes the cookies to the vultures. The Voodoo/Video Vultures fall for the trick and dance around in pain from the spicy taste. This gives the Mighty Robot some time to break the remote control. The Squeakyville mice are now free from hypnosis, and they all flee back to their houses.

Ricky's Mighty Robot then battles against the Voodoo/Video Vultures. In the end, the Mighty Robot wins the fight. The Voodoo Vultures then fly back to Venus, except for the Voodoo/Video Vultures' tyrannical leader, Victor Von Vulture. The Mighty Robot and Ricky then put him behind bars, and Ricky arrogantly brags at him, saying that he needs to learn responsibility. Ricky and his Mighty Robot then come home on time as Ricky's parents are very proud of them for learning their responsibility. The story ends with Ricky and his Mighty Robot watching Rocket Rodent on TV, complete with TV dinners.

Ricky Ricotta's Mighty Robot vs. the Mecha Monkeys from Mars

Ricky Ricotta's Mighty Robot vs. the Mecha-Monkeys from Mars (2002) is by Dav Pilkey and illustrated by Martin Ontiveros  (2002 version) and Dan Santat (2014 version), the fourth in the series.

Ricky and his robot grow tired of playing hide-and-seek, so they decide to skateboard instead. But there is no skateboard big enough for the Mighty Robot to ride on, so Ricky resorts to using his parents' minivan. After Ricky Ricotta and his robot accidentally destroy the minivan, Ricky's parents scold them for what they've just done. On Mars, Major Monkey still feels lonely, even after building many Robo-Chimps for company. So he decides to enslave the mice on Earth ... but not before disposing of the Mighty Robot first.

Ricky Ricotta and his Robot are trying to figure out how to deal with the problem about the minivan when a space mouse floats down to Earth. Ricky's robot follows the ship, but it is a trap. With the robot captured, Major Monkey and his army of Mecha-Monkeys launch an all-out assault on Squeakyville. Ricky feels terrible about what's happened to his friend and wonders what to do about it. A general from SASA arrives to save his robot from Mars. When Ricky approaches the lab, it turns out to be an Orangu-Tron. Ricky infiltrates the lab and frees his pal from the mech's clutches, then sets it to self-destruct.

The Mighty Robot takes the shuttle back to Earth, and after fighting the rest of the machines, Major Monkey is peeved because the monkeys are monkeying around. When the monkeys go back to Mars, Major Monkey cries as if he made a big mistake.  However, Ricky imprisons Major Monkey to pay for his mistake. When the general asks how they can repay Ricky and his robot, Ricky requests a new minivan. Ricky's parents race home the heroes in their new rocket-powered minivan, and everyone has cheese pizza and root beer.

Ricky Ricotta's Mighty Robot vs. the Jurassic Jackrabbits from Jupiter

Ricky Ricotta's Mighty Robot vs. the Jurassic Jackrabbits from Jupiter (2002) is a children's novel by Dav Pilkey and illustrated by Martin Ontiveros (2002 version) and Dan Santat (2014 version), the fifth in the series.

It is Ricky Ricotta's birthday, and his parents plan to take him to the dinosaur museum with his annoying cousin, Lucy ("Oh, NO! Not Lucy! She is a little pest!"). Meanwhile, on Jupiter, General Jackrabbit plans to take over Earth. He goes to Earth in his rocket ship, which lands on the dinosaur museum. Lucy, Ricky, and his parents notice the skulls on the dinosaur skeletons are gone, which General Jackrabbit stole. Ricky and his Mighty Robot then go the rooftop of the museum. They find the spaceship there. General Jackrabbit then gets some hairs from his tail and puts them in the DNA machine with the dinosaur skulls (the DNA strands were incomplete), and then the machine works. Three eggs pop out of the machine. They then hatch (into a Rabbidactyl, Trihareatops, and a Bunnysaurus Rex). Then, General Jackrabbit makes them grow bigger with his "Meany Machiney".

The Mighty Robot confronts the Jackrabbits, but General Jackrabbit blasts the Jackrabbits with the Meany Machiney again. The Jackrabbits defeat the Mighty Robot. Ricky wants to save his robot, so he rings the doorbell on General Jackrabbit's rocket ship. Two Robo-Rabbits open the door, replying that they will only accept Jackrabbits. Ricky gets help from Lucy when she disguises herself as a Jackrabbit. The Robo-Rabbits fall in love with Lucy. While the Robo-Rabbits bake food for her, Ricky sneaks upstairs and finds General Jackrabbit with the Meany Machiney. General Jackrabbit smells carrot cake, so he goes downstairs to see what the Robo-Rabbits are up to. Ricky then switches the complex controls from "Big, Ugly 'N' Evil" to "Little, Cute 'N' Sweet" and then zaps the Jurassic Jackrabbits. When the General catches Ricky messing around with his machine, Lucy hits General Jackrabbit in the face with a pie. Then, the three rabbits are put into their rocket ship and thrown back to their home planet by the Mighty Robot. Ricky and the Mighty Robot return the dinosaur skulls and bust General Jackrabbit. Lucy finds the little Jurassic Jackrabbits cute and keeps them as pets before it was time for Ricky's birthday; (to eat pizza, Ricky blows candles, and everyone eats the cake.)

Ricky Ricotta's Mighty Robot vs. the Stupid Stinkbugs from Saturn

Ricky Ricotta's Mighty Robot vs. the Stupid Stinkbugs from Saturn (2003) is a children's novel by Dav Pilkey and illustrated by Martin Ontiveros (2003 version) and Dan Santat (2015 version), the sixth in the series.

When they play cops and robbers in their yard, Ricky wants to be the robber because he is good at hiding, and his Mighty Robot wanted to be the cop because he is good at finding things. Ricky tells Mighty Robot that using x-ray vision is cheating. Ricky Ricotta and his Robot visit Ricky's Uncle Freddie, Aunt Ethel, and his annoying cousin Lucy, who has adopted the Jurassic Jackrabbits from the previous book and named them "Fudgie", "Cupcake", and "Waffles". Ricky gets irritated because Lucy always wants to play Princess. (thinking Lucy will be the princess, Ricky will be the ugly prince, Cupcake, Fudgie, and Waffles will be the royal ponies and the Mighty Robot will be the brave knight) Meanwhile, on the dark, smelly, polluted world of Saturn, Sergeant Stinkbug grows tired of the planet and decides to find another world to dump junk. Stinkbug decides to kidnap Earth's leader and spies on the planet. When he sees Lucy, Sergeant Stinkbug swoops down to Earth and kidnaps her while Ricky and his robot and the three Jurassic Jackrabbits are snacking away.
 
While Sergeant Stinkbug tries to interrogate Lucy, her Jurassic Jackrabbits come to the rescue. But Sergeant Stinkbug summons a few of his greatest stinkbug warriors and gives them "Grow-Big Gumballs", causing them to grow. The Mighty Robot battles well against them at first, but Sergeant Stinkbug gives them more Gumballs, making them bigger than they were before. Fudgie and Cupcake manage to swipe the Gumballs from under the stinkbugs' noses, and Ricky chomps them down. Once he is as big as the stinkbugs, he battles against them and wins. But then he soon realizes that he still needs to get rid of the foes. Then he sees that Lucy had eaten the rest of the Gumballs (as she enjoys eating them), and has grown way bigger than anyone else. She grabs the rest of the stinkbugs, stuffs them back inside the spaceship, and hurls them back to Saturn. Fudgie and Cupcake find "Super-Shrinking Saltwater Taffy" and feed it to the two cousins. Once they are back to normal, they throw Sergeant Stinkbug in the slammer.

When Ricky and Lucy get back and tell everyone what happened, they think it's all just part of a game they were playing. Ricky's father is happy that Ricky played nice with Lucy, though. The book finishes with the heroes celebrating their victory.

Ricky Ricotta's Mighty Robot vs. the Uranium Unicorns from Uranus

Ricky Ricotta's Mighty Robot vs. the Uranium Unicorns from Uranus (2005) is a children's novel by written Dav Pilkey and illustrated by Martin Ontiveros  (2005 version) and Dan Santat (2015 version), the seventh in the series.

The book starts with Ricky trying to play with his mighty robot, but he is unable to do certain things with his robot due to his massive size, saying the lines "This is fun!" every time the robot is able to successfully do something and "This is NOT fun" every time they fail. Ricky wishes that his Mighty Robot would have someone to play with himself; however, Ricky's wish actually turns out to be a plan of the evil Uncle Unicorn, whose planet is now polluted, as previous villains now dump their trash there. He creates a Ladybot, certain that he will be the first one to succeed at conquering Earth. Seemingly, he does, and Ricky's robot, hypnotized, falls in love with the Ladybot and gets abducted, unknown to Ricky, who now regrets his wish, his parents asked him to tuck him in tonight but he said no and went to sleep with a sad heart. Finally, he decides to find his robot and does so in the woods, where his robot is chained to a rocket ship and guarded by Uncle Unicorn's Uranium Unicorns, who are under the command of the Ladybot beside the evil Uncle. Ricky, shocked, stops by his cousin Lucy's house to borrow her Jurassic Jackrabbit, Waffles, along with Lucy herself. However, upon entering the Ladybot, they are captured by Uncle Unicorn and tied up, hanging above the Generator.

Ricky discovers that the Generator is sensitive to water and tries to sweat more and spit. He asks Lucy to spit for him, but she refuses when she thinks princesses do not spit. Ricky thinks up a plan and makes her burst into tears by saying that everything she loves will be destroyed (ice cream, chocolate chip cookies, cotton candy, coconut cream pie, vanilla wafers, and grape lollipops). The robot breaks free of the spell and battles the Unicorns. However, Uncle Unicorn starts the backup generator and makes the Ladybot grow into a bigger, deadlier machine ... who trips over almost immediately after activating. The heroes discover the reason why - her shoelaces were tied together by none other than Fudgie and Cupcake, the other two Jurassic Jackrabbits. Ricky's robot throws the Ladybot and the Uranium Unicorns into space and puts Uncle Unicorn in prison, which is getting quite crowded. The book ends with Ricky brushing the robot's teeth, putting on the robot's pajamas, and tucking him to bed. Ricky's parents were glad that they were having fun again since they are different before Ricky's reading a bedtime story to his Robot.

Ricky Ricotta's Mighty Robot vs. the Naughty Nightcrawlers from Neptune

Ricky Ricotta's Mighty Robot vs. the Naughty Nightcrawlers from Neptune (2016) is a children's novel by Dav Pilkey and illustrated by Dan Santat. The 8th book in the series, it released in 2016 after spending over a decade in development hell.

Before Ricky's parents go shopping, they tell him and the robot not to make any mess while they're gone. Ricky and his robot build a fort using debris from an abandoned building. But Farmer Feta, Ricky's next door neighbor, is annoyed by all the commotion. When Ricky's parents return home and notice the stylish fort, Ricky's mother is most displeased and calls it a mess. Later, Ricky's aunt and uncle arrive with cousin Lucy and her Jurassic Jackrabbits. Lucy calls the fort a castle and says it should be painted pink, much to Ricky's dismay.

Meanwhile, on planet Neptune, Nimrod Nightcrawler is planning to take over Earth due to the environment being clouded by methane vapors from fossil fuel digging and forcing the nightcrawlers to live underground. But knows that Ricky and the Mighty Robot stand in his way and wants to avoid the other villains' mistakes. Nimrod launches a rocket with an inflatable teleporter (wormhole) to planet Earth, which crash-lands on Farmer Feta's property. Through the wormhole, Nimrod convinces the Farmer that he can stop Ricky and his robot for their annoyances by digging tunnels under his property. The army of Naughty Nightcrawlers dig straight under Ricky's fort, causing the ground to become unstable. When the robot tries to save the fort, the ground gives way and the robot ends up falling into the pit, imprisoned by the rubble from the ruined fort. Farmer Feta owns up to his mistake and the kids decide to enter the wormhole.

Finding themselves in Neptune's caverns, Ricky and Lucy happen upon nightcrawler guards watching the destruction of Squeakyville. Unfortunately, their presence is given away, and the guards put the squeeze on their uninvited guests. The heroes tickle the nightcrawlers to release their grip and head back to Earth through the wormhole; however, the nightcrawlers follow and trap their prey. At that moment, the Mighty Robot comes to the rescue having been dug up by the drilling suit Lucy rode on the way back. The Nightcrawlers retreat through the wormhole, and the robot takes on Nimrod and his army, who are still wreaking havoc in the city. After the Naughty Nightcrawlers' defeat, Nimrod himself is locked away.

There is still the issue of the big mess in the back yard, but Ricky remedies the issue by using the wormhole. Everyone dumps all the scrap into the wormhole, and it winds up in the nightcrawler tunnels on Neptune, crushing their technology in the process. With the wormhole powered down, a deep pit remains in the yard, but Lucy turns it into an artificial pond. The story concludes with Ricky, the Robot (using the deactivated wormhole as his inflatable tube), Lucy, and her pets swimming around in the backyard pond.

Ricky Ricotta's Mighty Robot vs. the Unpleasant Penguins from Pluto

Ricky Ricotta's Mighty Robot vs. the Unpleasant Penguins from Pluto (2016) is a children's novel by Dav Pilkey and illustrated by Dan Santat. The 9th book in the series, it released in 2016 after spending over a decade in development hell.

Ricky and his robot are having fun in their backyard pond until cousin Lucy shows up. She pours pink bubble bath in the pond, thinking it'll be glamorous. But Ricky doesn't agree, and calls out on her while the adults are playing cards. Ricky's parents scold him for being mean, but Lucy starts crying and leaves before Ricky can get the change to apologize.

On the world of Pluto, President Penguin is feeling dishonored that his home world is no longer considered a planet. Determined to teach Earth to show respect, the President sets off to Earth to have everyone replay the insult.

Back on Earth, Ricky decides to show Lucy how sorry he really is (he has to explain the meaning of "making amends" since the robot is unfamiliar). The robot flies Ricky to Hawaii to gather beautiful wildflowers, and when the two return, they spend all night planting them on a mountain in Squeakyville for Lucy to see. At daybreak, President Penguin's spaceship lands on the mountain. Ricky calls Lucy and tells her about the surprise he has for her. When she spies the castle-like spaceship on the mountain with her name planted in flowers, Lucy and her Jurassic Jackrabbits race to the spaceship, unaware that the ship is not actually part of the surprise. When Lucy and her pets approach the President's head guards, Clancy and Nigel, the penguins treat Lucy as a real princess and bake goods for her in the "castle".

Meanwhile, President Penguin has launched an invasion on the city of Squeakyville. Ricky and his robot catch sight of the Penguin-Mobiles and try to halt the assault,  but the machines encase the robot's feet in ice with their freezer beams. Lucy and her pets hear the commotion, and when they see what has happened, Clancy and Nigel explain the reason behind the President's actions. Knowing that she must help her cousin, Lucy tries to intervene, but President Penguin subdues them as well. At that moment, two missiles from nowhere clip the two Penguin-Mobiles guarding the Mighty Robot. It turns out that Clancy and Nigel are intervening as well, and they destroy President's Penguin-Mobile. The explosion sends everyone flying, and after the Mighty Robot saves Ricky in the nick of time, President Penguin is dealt with accordingly.

Since President Penguin is now in the cooler, Lucy declares Clancy and Nigel as Pluto's new Presidents. Having made amends, Clancy and Nigel take the captain and the first mate and fly back to Pluto. Since Squeakyville jail is now full, an expansion is under construction. At home, Ricky and the robot welcome Lucy and her pets to the pond, having fun together. Ricky's parents thank their son for apologizing and making amends to Lucy. The book ends with everyone having a pond party.

Activity book
Ricky Ricotta's Mighty Robot Astro-Activity Book o' Fun (2006) is an activity book  by Dav Pilkey and illustrated by Martin Ontiveros. It contains puzzles, true-or-false, and even a first peek at Naughty Nightcrawlers from Neptune and Un-Pleasant Penguins from Pluto (though these two installments were not released with illustrations by Ontiveros).

Notes

References

External links

Ricky Ricotta's Mighty Robot (Ricky Ricotta official site)
Pilkey.com (Ricky Ricotta's Mighty Robot on Dav Pilkey's official site)
Classroom guide (Classroom guide to Ricky Ricotta)

Children's science fiction novels
Science fiction book series
Fictional mice and rats
Fictional robots
Works by Dav Pilkey
Novels set on Mercury (planet)
Novels set on Venus
Novels set on Mars
Fiction set on Jupiter
Fiction set on Saturn
Fiction set on Uranus
Fiction set on Neptune
Fiction set on Pluto
Fiction about the Solar System
Pluto's planethood